In aviation, precision runway monitor (PRM) is a high-speed, high-precision radar system developed by Raytheon to monitor simultaneous close parallel instrument approaches to airports. 

Airports at which PRM is in use in the United States include Chicago-O'Hare, San Francisco, Detroit, and Atlanta. Internationally only Sydney, Australia uses PRM.

Additionally, flight crew wishing to fly PRM approaches are required to undergo specific training related to these approaches before taking part. The training includes practicing the climbing and descending “BREAKOUT” manoeuvre in the simulator.

See also 

 Instrument approach

Airport infrastructure